The Arizona State Sun Devils football team represented Arizona State University in the 2004 NCAA Division I-A football season. It played its home games at Sun Devil Stadium in Tempe, Arizona.

Schedule

Season summary

Northwestern

Oregon

References

Arizona State
Arizona State Sun Devils football seasons
Sun Bowl champion seasons
Arizona State Sun Devils football